Salil Banerjee (born 1 October 1935) is an Indian former cricketer. He played five first-class matches for Bengal between 1958 and 1962.

See also
 List of Bengal cricketers

References

External links
 

1935 births
Living people
Indian cricketers
Bengal cricketers
Cricketers from Kolkata